Mike Fong (born 1976/77) is an American politician serving in the California State Assembly from the 49th district, which includes parts of the San Gabriel Valley, including El Monte, Monterey Park, Alhambra, and San Gabriel. He was elected in a 2022 special election to replace Ed Chau, who resigned after being nominated to the Los Angeles County Superior Court.

Early life and education 
Fong graduated from Francisco Bravo Medical Magnet High School and attended East Los Angeles College. He holds a Bachelor of Science in Psychobiology from the University of California, Los Angeles and a Master of Public Administration from California State University, Northridge.

Career 
Prior to his election to the California State Assembly, he served in various positions in Los Angeles County, including as a deputy mayor, a councilman's aide, and as a member of the Los Angeles Community College District Board of Trustees.

He was sworn in on February 22, 2022.

Electoral history

References

External links

American politicians of Chinese descent
Living people
Politicians from Los Angeles
Democratic Party members of the California State Assembly
University of California, Los Angeles alumni
Year of birth missing (living people)